The Range Rats was a band formed in 1986.

History
In 1986, following the breakup of the Portland, Oregon band Western Front, guitarist/vocalist Fred Cole and his wife Toody (bass/vocals) formed The Range Rats, which continued Western Front's mix of punk rock and country music. Drummer Andrew Loomis auditioned for The Range Rats but it didn't work out, so Fred and Toody enlisted a drum machine and began touring Oregon mining towns. They recorded an unreleased album, but on the way back from a Reno vacation in 1987, Cole decided he wanted to return to the rock 'n' roll he had played in bands such as The Lollipop Shoppe and The Rats. A second audition with Loomis worked out, and Dead Moon began. Songs by The Range Rats wound up in the Dead Moon documentary Unknown Passage, and the song "Go My Way" was rerecorded for Dead Moon's Dead Ahead album.

Punk rock groups from Oregon
Musical groups from Portland, Oregon
1986 establishments in Oregon
1987 disestablishments in Oregon
Musical groups established in 1986
Musical groups disestablished in 1987